25 Watts is a 2001 Uruguayan urban comedy drama film directed and written by Juan Pablo Rebella and Pablo Stoll.  The independent film picture stars Daniel Hendler, Jorge Temponi, and Alfonso Tort. The film received a total of ten awards and three additional nominations, including Best Feature Film Award at the Rotterdam International Film Festival, Best First Feature Film Award at the Havana Film Festival, and others.

Plot
The film covers 24 hours in the life of three youths in Montevideo. The story is about three young boys, Leche, Javi and Seba, trying to survive until Sunday. They have a lot of problems regarding studies, girls, and their lives consist mostly of drinking or sleeping or meeting strange people like the crazy delivery boy, a retarded drug addict, and a philosophical counter clerk at a video rental store.

Javi has landed a job driving a sound truck that plays the same radio spot for pasta all day long, while his buddy Leche, who is supposed to be studying for his exams, instead finds himself having sexual fantasies about his tutor, and Seba is waylaid by a handful of small-time dope dealers when all he wants to do is go home and watch the porno movie he's just rented.

Cast
 Daniel Hendler as Leche
 Jorge Temponi as Javi
 Alfonso Tort as Seba
 Valentín Rivero as Hernán, a blond friend
 Walter Reyno as Don Héctor, Javi's boss
 Damián Barrera as Joselo, Héctor's son
 César Herrera as Neighbor in elevator
 Judith Anaya as Leche's grandmother
 Federico Veiroj as Gerardito
 Valeria Mendieta as María
 Silvio Sielsky as Pitufo, the Guinness records freak
 Claudio Martínez as Kiwi, young man with ball
 Teresita González as Neighbor with chair
 Roberto Suárez as Gepetto, the pizza man
 Gonzalo Eyherabide as Sandía, the video club owner
 Robert More as Rulo, a junkie
 Carolina Presno as Beatriz
 Nacho Mendy as Chopo, Rulo's friend
 Leo Trincabelli as Menchaca, Rulo's friend
 Luis Villasante as Waiter
 Marcelo Ramón as Bouncer
 Daniel Mella as Lalo, Beatriz' boyfriend

Exhibition
The film first previewed at the Rotterdam International Film Festival in the Netherlands on January 28, 2001 but was not released fully in Uruguay until June 1.

The picture was screened at various film festivals, including: the Karlovy Vary Film Festiva, Czech Republic; the Helsinki International Film Festival, Finland; the Warsaw Film Festival, Poland; the Medellín de Película, Colombia; the Latin America Film Festival, Poland; and others.

Critical reception
Deborah Young, film critic for Variety magazine and reporting from the Rotterdam Film Festival, gave the film a mixed review and wrote,  "A rare offering from Uruguay, 25 Watts dully portrays the dim lives of three teenage boys in a sleepy Montevideo neighborhood. With no story to tell, tyro co-directors Juan Pablo Rebella and Pablo Stoll place far too much faith in hang-dog, Jim Jarmusch-style humor, emphasized by repetitious dialog, flat B&W lensing, and limited sets. Pic—which won one of the three Tiger Awards and the Youth Jury Prize at Rotterdam—lacks the spark of inspiration that would make this formula work, and most viewers are likely to run for cover well before the end."

Awards
Wins
 Uruguayan Film Critics Association: UFCA Award, Best Uruguayan Film; 2001.
 Bogotá Film Festival: Honorable Mention, Juan Pablo Rebella; For focusing on the daily problems of today's youth; 2001.
 Buenos Aires International Festival of Independent Cinema: Best Actor, Daniel Hendler, Jorge Temponi and Alfonso Tort; FIPRESCI Prize, Juan Pablo Rebella, Pablo Stoll; For injecting humor, visual energy and delightful dialogue into the 'Slacker' movie formula; 2001.
 Cinema Jove - Valencia International Film Festival, Spain: Audience Award, Feature Film, Pablo Stoll and Juan Pablo Rebella; Special Mention, Feature Film, Pablo Stoll and Juan Pablo Rebella; 2001.
 Havana Film Festival: Coral, Best First Work, Pablo Stoll and Juan Pablo Rebella; 2001.
 Lima Latin American Film Festival: Best Screenplay, Juan Pablo Rebella and Pablo Stoll; 2001.
 Rotterdam International Film Festival: MovieZone Award, Juan Pablo Rebella and Pablo Stoll; Tiger Award, Juan Pablo Rebella and Pablo Stoll; 2001.

Nominations
 Bogotá Film Festival: Golden Precolumbian Circle, Best Film, Juan Pablo Rebella, Pablo Stoll; 2001.
 Buenos Aires International Festival of Independent Cinema: Best Film, Juan Pablo Rebella and Pablo Stoll; 2001.
 Gramado Film Festival, Brazil: Golden Kikito, Latin Film Competition - Best Film, Juan Pablo Rebella and Pablo Stoll; 2001.

References

External links
 
 25 Watts film review at La Nación by Fernando López 
 

2001 films
2001 comedy-drama films
Films directed by Juan Pablo Rebella
Films directed by Pablo Stoll
Films set in Montevideo
Films shot in Montevideo
Uruguayan independent films
2000s Spanish-language films
2001 directorial debut films
2001 independent films
Uruguayan comedy-drama films